is a Japanese footballer who plays as a goalkeeper for Urawa Reds and the Japan national team. He was born in Little Rock, Arkansas in the United States to a mother of Ghanaian Ewe descent and a Japanese father.

Career statistics

Club

Honors and awards

Club
Urawa Red Diamonds
Emperor's Cup: 2021
Japanese Super Cup: 2022

References

External links

2002 births
Living people
Japanese footballers
American soccer players
Japan youth international footballers
Association football goalkeepers
J1 League players
Urawa Red Diamonds players
American sportspeople of Ghanaian descent
American sportspeople of Japanese descent
Japanese people of African-American descent
Japanese people of Ghanaian descent
Citizens of Japan through descent
Sportspeople of Ghanaian descent
Footballers at the 2020 Summer Olympics
Olympic footballers of Japan